Shi Jian (died 350) was emperor of the Chinese state Later Zhao.

Shi Jian may also refer to:

 Shi Jian (sailor), a Chinese sailor and yacht racer
 Shi Jian, the Mandarin name of Shih Kien
 Shi Jianqiao, the murderer of warlord Sun Chuanfang

See also 

 Shih Chien University